Tyne Amateur Rowing Club (TARC) is the longest established rowing club on the River Tyne in Newcastle upon Tyne, UK.

History
Founded in 1852 the club is affiliated to British Rowing and rows from their dedicated facility on the banks of the Tyne in Newburn Tyne and Wear.

The club have active squads for men, women, masters, novices and juniors.

Honours

Henley Royal Regatta

British champions

External links
Tyne Amateur Rowing Club

References

Rowing clubs in England
Sport in Newcastle upon Tyne
River Tyne
Sports clubs established in 1852
1852 establishments in England